Calonotos angustipennis is a moth of the subfamily Arctiinae. It was described by Zerny in 1931. It is found in Brazil and French Guiana.

References

Arctiinae
Moths described in 1931